Babiana stricta, the baboon flower or blue freesia, is a species of flowering plant in the family Iridaceae, native to Cape Province, South Africa and naturalized in Australia. The leaves show linear venation.

There are many hybrids and cultivars with different colored flowers, usually blue or pink with white additions. They are grouped in an inflorescence and often have a pleasant lemon scent. The seeds are black with a hard coat, collected in round seed capsules.

The specific epithet stricta means "erect, upright".

Cultivation

This plant has gained the Royal Horticultural Society's Award of Garden Merit.

References

External links
 

stricta
Endemic flora of South Africa
Garden plants of Southern Africa
Plants described in 1789